Phoradendron coryae,  Cory's mistletoe or oak mistletoe, is a hemiparasitic plant native to the southwestern United States and northern Mexico. It is reported from Arizona, New Mexico, Texas, Chihuahua, Coahuila and Sonora.

The species generally grows on oaks (Quercus spp.) but has also been found on Condalia, Berberis, Vaquelinia and Sideroxylon. It has larger leaves than many other mistletoes of the region, up to 3 cm long. Leaves and flowers are pubescent. Berries are white, with short hairs around the persistent perianth.

References

coryae
Parasitic plants
Flora of Arizona
Flora of Nevada
Flora of Texas
Flora of Sonora
Flora of Chihuahua (state)
Flora of New Mexico
Flora of Coahuila
Flora without expected TNC conservation status
Taxa named by William Trelease